The Texas spiny softshell turtle (Apalone spinifera emoryi) is a subspecies of the spiny softshell turtle in the family Trionychidae. The subspecies is native to the southwestern United States and adjacent northeastern Mexico.

Etymology
The subspecific name, emoryi, is in honor of United States Army officer and surveyor William Hemsley Emory.

Geographic range
A. s. emoryi is found in western Texas and New Mexico, in the Rio Grande and its immediate tributaries, and in the Mexican states of Coahuila and Tamaulipas.

References

Further reading
Agassiz L (1857). Contributions to the Natural History of the United States of America. Vol. I. Boston: Little, Brown and Company. li + 452 pp. (Aspidonectes emoryi, new species, pp. 407–408).
Boulenger GA (1889). Catalogue of the Chelonians, Rhynchocephalians, and Crocodiles in the British Museum (Natural History). New Edition. London: Trustees of the British Museum (Natural History). (Taylor and Francis, printers). x + 311 pp. + Plates I–III. (Trionyx emoryi, p. 258).
Powell R, Conant R, Collins JT 2016). Peterson Field Guide to Reptiles and Amphibians of Eastern and Central North America, Fourth Edition. Boston and New York: Houghton Mifflin Harcourt. xiv + 494 pp., 47 color plates, 207 figures. . (Apalone spinifera emoryi, p. 233).

Smith HM, Brodie ED Jr (1982). Reptiles of North America: A Guide to Field Identification. New York: Golden Press. 240 pp.  (paperback),  (hardcover). (Trionyx spiniferus emoryi, pp. 32–33).
Stebbins RC (2003). A Field Guide to Western Reptiles and Amphibians, Third Edition. The Peterson Field Guide Series ®. Boston and New York: Houghton Mifflin Company. xiii + 533 pp., 56 color plates. . (Trionyx spiniferus emoryi, p. 262).

External links

Turtle Field Guide: Spiny Softshell Subspecies

Apalone
Turtles of North America
Reptiles of the United States
Fauna of the Southwestern United States
Fauna of the Rio Grande valleys
Taxa named by Louis Agassiz